The 2006 Fordham Rams football team was an American football team that represented Fordham University during the 2006 NCAA Division I FCS football season. Fordham finished second-to-last in the Patriot League. 

In their first year under head coach Tom Masella, the Rams compiled a 3–8 record. Micah Clukey, Carl Garritano, James Prydatko and Marcus Taylor were the team captains.

The Rams were outscored 289 to 158. Their 1–5 conference record placed sixth out of seven in the Patriot League standings. 

Fordham played its home games at Jack Coffey Field on the university's Rose Hill campus in The Bronx, in New York City.

Schedule

References

Fordham
Fordham Rams football seasons
Fordham Rams football